Phituckchai Limraksa (born 27 March 1997) is a Thai professional footballer who plays as a left back for Thai League 3 club Mahasarakham .

References

External links
 

1997 births
Living people
Phituckchai Limraksa
Phituckchai Limraksa
Association football midfielders
Phituckchai Limraksa
Phituckchai Limraksa